Sayyad District (Persian: ولسوالی صیاد) is a district of Sar-e Pol Province, Afghanistan. The estimated population in 2019 was 60,585.

See also
 Districts of Afghanistan

References

Districts of Sar-e Pol Province